"Love & Emotion" is the first single from the album Love & Emotion, released by Freestyle music singer Stevie B in 1990. It is the first song from Stevie B to enter the Top 15 of the Billboard Hot 100, and also the first to enter the singles chart in Germany, where he achieved the position #31. A music video was also shot for the song.

Tracks
7 "single

12 "/ CD single

, 12 "Promo Single

, 12 "Promo Single

Positions on the charts

Top positions

Annual Positions

References

External links
 https://web.archive.org/web/20140302153013/http://www.musicline.de/de/chartverfolgung_summary/artist/Stevie+B/?type=single
 https://web.archive.org/web/20160309202042/http://www.collectionscanada.gc.ca/rpm/028020-119.01-e.php?&file_num=nlc008388.1341&type=1&interval=20&PHPSESSID=4u444os8oh391jedk635aciqd7
 http://www.collectionscanada.gc.ca/rpm/028020-119.01-e.php?brws_s=1&file_num=nlc008388.1329&type=1&interval=24&PHPSESSID=4u444os8oh391jedk635aciqd7
 http://www.allmusic.com/album/love-emotion-mw0000689971/awards
 https://web.archive.org/web/20160303204212/http://www.collectionscanada.gc.ca/rpm/028020-119.01-e.php?brws_s=1&file_num=nlc008388.9163&type=1&interval=24&PHPSESSID=4u444os8oh391jedk635aciqd7

1990 singles
Stevie B songs
1990 songs
Song articles with missing songwriters